Little Easton is a village and civil parish in Essex, England. Little Easton parish is defined at the west by the River Roding, and the east by the River Chelmer. The village and civil parish of Great Easton lie one mile (1.6 km) to the north.

History
Little Easton dates from the 12th century and is recorded in the Domesday Book in 1086 as Estaines Parva in the Hundred of Dunmow.

Little Easton is traditionally a village and parish in the Dunmow Hundred, and the Rural Deanery of Dunmow and Archdeaconry of Essex in the  Diocese of St Albans. St Mary's parish church has memorial monuments to Viscount Maynard (died 1865) and others of the Maynard family from 1610 to 1746 in the Bouchier chapel. in 1882  remains of "nearly obliterated... ancient" wall paintings were present within the church. The north aisle was rebuilt in 1881 at a cost of £1,500. An organ was added 1891 in memory of the 4th Earl Rosslyn by Daisy Greville, Countess of Warwick at a cost of £500. Church sittings at the time numbered 200. The church register dates to 1559.

Almshouses next to the church were for "four aged widows", but by 1902 were accommodating six old people.  A National School for boys and girls was built for 80 children in 1878, and had an average 1882 attendance of nine, and in 1902 of 54. A post office existed in 1902.

Soil of the parish was of loam overlaid with a mixture of loam and sand, and grew chiefly wheat, beans, barley and root crops. Population in 1881 was 295, and in 1901 was 325.

Living in the parish were Lord and Lady Brooke, the later Earl and Countess of Warwick, at Easton Lodge, who were also resident at Berwick House in the Stable Yard of St James's Palace, London, and in 1902, after elevation to title, Warwick Castle. Parish occupations in 1882 included three farmers, one of whom was also a miller (water), a farm bailiff, a beer retailer, a fanwright (maker of fans), two shopkeepers, the  publican of the Stag Inn, an accountant, an agent to the Earl of Rosslyn, and a clerk to the Easton estates. By 1902 the number of farmers and beer retailers remained the same. The Stag Inn was still operating, and there was a wheelwright, although now only one shopkeeper. There was a Treasurer and Honorary Secretary of the Workmen's Club, and the artists Frank and Charlotte Mura at Mill End studio. The clerk to the Easton estates remained, although the agent to the Earl of Rosslyn didn't.

During the second world war the US Air Force created an airfield at nearby Easton Lodge, which was the base of the 386th Bomb Group (Marauders) of the 9th AF USAAF. Although the airfield has long been transformed back into fields, the outline of the airport is evident from the air, as seen through Google Earth, just to the east of the current Stansted Airport.

Easton lodge
Easton Lodge, in 1882 the late seat of Viscount Maynard, was described as a mansion in Elizabethan style, the greater part of which was destroyed by fire in 1847, after which was rebuilt for a cost of £10,090. Little Easton Workmen's Club was established in 1885 "for the use of residents in the parish and workmen employed on the Easton Lodge estates"; the club housed a library of 450 volumes and was supplied with newspapers and periodicals.

Easton Lodge was built in 1597 by Henry Maynard, to replace a medieval manor house which was situated by the church. Most of the original house has been destroyed over the years by fires, but there is a project underway to restore the gardens. Easton Lodge was the home of Frances Evelyn Maynard (1861-1938), also known as Daisy, who became Countess of Warwick and a noted 'champagne socialist'.

Community
Little Easton parish population in 2011 was 437.

The village public house, The Stag, is on Duck Street, the main road of the village. The parish church, the Grade I listed St Mary the Virgin, is on Park Road at the south of the village. Mike Reid, the actor and comedian, was buried in the churchyard following his death on 29 July 2007. Adjacent to the church is the Manor house, which is not open to the public, although there are four ornamental lakes which are open for recreational use, including fishing.

See also 
Daisy Greville, Countess of Warwick
The Hundred Parishes

References

External links

Villages in Essex
Uttlesford